The Shards is a 2023 autofiction novel by American author Bret Easton Ellis, was published on January 17, 2023, by Alfred A. Knopf. Ellis's first novel in 13 years, The Shards is a fictionalized memoir of Ellis's final year of high school in 1981 in Los Angeles. The novel was first serialized by Ellis as an audiobook through his podcast on Patreon.

Publication
The Shards was first serialized as an audiobook read by Ellis through his podcast on Patreon. The audio serial was published in twenty-seven individual installments, released between September 6, 2020, and September 6, 2021.

On December 1, 2021, Ellis announced on Instagram that the manuscript of The Shards had just arrived for him to look over. In May 2022, pre-orders for the book were made available. It was published by Alfred A. Knopf on January 17, 2023.

Reception
Reviewing the audiobook for The Times in 2021, Theo Zenou called it Ellis's "weirdest, most interesting work in years" and felt it was "rendered all the more absorbing" by the audiobook format.

Kirkus Reviews wrote, "The usual issues with Ellis apply to this bulky novel: The flatness of the characters, the gratuitousness of the violence, the Didion-esque cool that sometimes reads as Olympian smugness. But as the story proceeds, it also becomes easier to admire Ellis' ability to sustain the mood."

Publishers Weekly wrote that the book "feels like two disparate novels—an overly detailed, fictionalized memoir and a high gothic serial killer thriller—that never come together meaningfully or believably."

Melissa Broder said in The New York Times that the book "invit[es] the reader more profoundly into the emotional realm of the protagonist" than Ellis's earlier works. While the length and looping narrative helped build suspense, "the reader wonders if the book could have been shorter and still achieved the same psychedelic, collage-like effect", she wrote. Broder concluded that "the novel’s climax and denouement ultimately fall flat".

References

2023 American novels
Autofiction
Alfred A. Knopf books
American memoirs
American horror novels
Fiction set in 1981
Novels by Bret Easton Ellis
Novels set in the 1980s
Novels set in Los Angeles
Audiobooks
Novels about serial killers